Clark Kerr (May 17, 1911 – December 1, 2003) was an American professor of economics and academic administrator. He was the first chancellor of the University of California, Berkeley, and twelfth president of the University of California.

Biography

Early years 
Kerr was born in Stony Creek, Pennsylvania, to Samuel William and Caroline (Clark) Kerr.  He was raised on rural farms outside of Reading, Pennsylvania, first in the Stony Creek area and then in the Oley Valley after age 10. Even after Kerr became one of the most prominent academic administrators of his generation, he always regarded himself as a "Pennsylvania farm boy" and expressed frustration with intellectuals who showed condescension towards agriculture.

Kerr earned his A.B. from Swarthmore College in 1932, an M.A. from Stanford University in 1933, and a Ph.D. in economics from UC Berkeley in 1939. In 1945, he became an associate professor of industrial relations and was the founding director of the UC Berkeley Institute of Industrial Relations.

Career

Becoming chancellor of UC Berkeley 
Soon after the beginning of the Second Red Scare (the McCarthy era), in 1949, the Regents of the University of California adopted an anti-communist loyalty oath to be signed by all University of California employees. Kerr signed the oath, but fought against the firing of those who refused to sign. Kerr gained respect from his stance and was named UC Berkeley's first chancellor when that position was created in 1952. As chancellor, Kerr oversaw the construction of 12 high-rise dormitories. In September 1953, President Dwight D. Eisenhower appointed him to the Commission on Intergovernmental Relations.

Becoming president of the University of California 

In October 1957, Kerr was the Regents' unanimous choice to lead the entire university system. Raymond B. Allen had been widely expected to succeed Robert Gordon Sproul as systemwide president, but Allen's tenure as UCLA's first chancellor was marred by athletics scandals, poor campus planning, and the perception among the southern Regents that he had not put up enough resistance—especially in comparison to Kerr—to Sproul's stubborn refusal to delegate anything to the campus chancellors. Therefore, when Sproul finally announced his retirement in 1957, Allen was passed over in favor of Kerr. With a clear mandate for change, Kerr led UC's rapid transformation into a true public university system through a series of proposals adopted unanimously by the Regents from 1957 to 1960.  Kerr's reforms included delegating to the chancellors the full range of powers, privileges, and responsibilities which Sproul had previously denied them.

Kerr's term as UC president saw the opening of campuses in San Diego, Irvine, and Santa Cruz to accommodate the influx of baby boomers. Faced with a dramatic increase of students entering college, Kerr helped establish the now much-copied California system of having the handful of University of California campuses act as 'top tier' research institutions, the more numerous California State University campuses handle the bulk of undergraduate students and the very numerous California Community College campuses provide vocational and transfer-oriented college programs to the remainder. A Mother Jones article mentioned that Kerr's achievements in this field earned him international acclaim.

In 1959, Kerr along with Chancellor Glenn T. Seaborg helped found the Berkeley Space Sciences Laboratory.

Student protests
Controversy exploded in 1964 when Berkeley students led the Free Speech Movement in protest of regulations limiting political activities on campus, including Civil Rights advocacy and protests against the Vietnam War. It culminated in hundreds of arrested students at a sit-in. Kerr's initial decision was to not expel University of California students that participated in sit-ins off campus. That decision evolved into reluctance to expel students who later would protest on campus in a series of escalating events on the Berkeley campus in late 1964. Kerr was criticized both by students for not agreeing to their demands and by conservative UC Regent Edwin Pauley and others for responding too leniently to the student unrest.

Blacklisting 
In 2002, the FBI released documents used to blacklist Kerr as part of a government campaign to suppress subversive viewpoints at the university. This information had been classified by the FBI and was released only after a fifteen-year legal battle that the FBI repeatedly appealed up to the Supreme Court, but agreed to settle before the Supreme Court decided on hearing the matter. President Lyndon Johnson had picked Kerr to become Secretary of Health, Education and Welfare but withdrew the nomination after the FBI background check on Kerr included damaging information the agency knew to be false.

Edwin Pauley approached CIA Director John McCone (a Berkeley alum and associate) for assistance. McCone in turn met with FBI Director J. Edgar Hoover. Hoover agreed to supply Pauley with confidential FBI information on "ultra-liberal" regents, faculty members, and students, and to assist in removing Kerr. Pauley received dozens of briefings from the FBI to this end. The FBI assisted Pauley and Ronald Reagan in painting Kerr as a dangerous "liberal".

Dismissal

During his successful campaign in the 1966 California gubernatorial election, Reagan repeatedly promised to "clean up the mess at Berkeley." In 1987, Lyn Nofziger revealed to Kerr that Reagan actually did not know much about UC at the beginning of his campaign, but had tacked right in order to prevail in the Republican primary against George Christopher, and started focusing on the "student revolt at Berkeley" after a poll determined that it was a priority of Republican voters.  As a newly elected governor, Reagan appointed several more regents who, together with himself (in his capacity as an ex officio regent) aligned with existing members of the Board of Regents to form a majority (14 to 8) to vote for Kerr's dismissal on January 20, 1967.  Kerr knew what was coming and did not actively fight it in the sense of actively lobbying the Board of Regents.  But as a matter of principle (because he felt the Board of Regents should have stood up for the university's institutional autonomy from the rest of the state government), Kerr chose to not make it easy for Reagan by not resigning, even though he knew he would bear the lifelong stigma of being dismissed.

Shortly thereafter, Kerr's old friend Thomas M. Storke insisted that Kerr should be allowed to participate, as previously scheduled, in the dedication of a building on the Santa Barbara campus in Storke's honor. At the dedication ceremony Kerr stated that he had left the presidency of the university just as he had entered it: "fired with enthusiasm".

Kerr's second memoir, The Gold and the Blue: A Personal Memoir of the University of California, 1949-1967 Volume Two: Political Turmoil details what he refers to as his greatest blunders in dealing with the Free Speech Movement that ultimately led to his firing.

Later career

Following his dismissal, Kerr served on the Carnegie Commission on Higher Education until 1973 and was chairman of the Carnegie Council on Policy Studies in Higher Education from 1974 to 1979.

Kerr also served as chair of the 1984 USPS National Agreement Arbitration Panel, after which he joined the USPS panel of national contract arbitrators.

Personal life
Kerr was married to Catherine "Kay" Spaulding on Christmas Day, 1934. Kay along with friends founded the Save San Francisco Bay Association in 1961, which became Save the Bay. The couple had three children; Clark E., Jr., Alexander, and Caroline Gage. He died on December 1, 2003, in El Cerrito, California, following complications from a fall.

Legacy and honors
There are Kerr Halls on the Davis, Santa Barbara, Santa Cruz, and Berkeley campuses. A 50-acre student residence complex at UC Berkeley, the Clark Kerr Campus, is also named in his honor.

The Berkeley facility is located a few blocks from the main campus, and includes residences and sports practice facilities. The Spanish-style residential complex houses 700 students and features landscaped gardens and a conference center. It was previously the site of the California School for the Deaf and Blind, and was acquired by the university after a court battle. (The university was not a party to the case. It was offered the site after the Schools for the Deaf and Blind relinquished it to the State as surplus property.)

The Clark Kerr Award is named in his honor.  Since 1968, it has been awarded annually by the UC Berkeley Academic Senate to recognize an individual who has made an extraordinary and distinguished contribution to the advancement of higher education.  Kerr himself was the first recipient of the award.

Another important part of Kerr's legacy was his wit—after writing a serious book, The Uses of the University, Kerr surprised an audience with this riposte—"The three purposes of the University?—To provide sex for the students, sports for the alumni, and parking for the faculty."

Bibliography
 Charles Burress "The Long, Hard Years at Berkeley; Second Volume of Clark Kerr's Memoir Covers Politics and 'Blunders, San Francisco Chronicle, February 9, 2003, Sunday Review, p. 1.
 Arthur Levine (ed., 1993). Higher Learning in America. Baltimore: The Johns Hopkins University Press.
Seth Rosenfeld Subversives: The FBI's War on Student Radicals, and Reagan's Rise to Power. Farrar, Straus and Giroux, 2012. 
 Schrum, Ethan, "Clark Kerr's Early Career, Social Science, and the American University", Perspectives on the History of Higher Education 28 (2011), 193–222.
Schrum, Ethan. The Instrumental University: Education in Service of the National Agenda after World War II. Ithaca, NY: Cornell University Press, 2019.

Primary sources
Clark Kerr The Gold and the Blue: A Personal Memoir of the University of California, 1949-1967
Clark Kerr The Uses of the University, 5th edition. 1963; Harvard University Press, 2001.
Clark Kerr, John T. Dunlop, Frederick H. Harbison, and Charles A. Myers, Industrialism and Industrial Man: The Problem of Labor and Management in Economic Growth. Harvard University Press, 1960.
"UC Won't Expel Sit-in Students", Los Angeles Times, May 6, 1964, p. 8.
"The Arrests at Berkeley", The New York Times, December 5, 1964, p. 30.

References

External links

U.C. Berkeley news release
 San Francisco Chronicle, "Reagan, Hoover, and the UC Red Scare", June 9, 2002.
AP obituary
NPR All Things Considered - Educator Clark Kerr Dies at 92
account of secret files of the FBI on Kerr, and Kerr's ouster.
In Memoriam at the University of California.

Stanford University alumni
Swarthmore College alumni
University of California regents
University of California, Berkeley alumni
University of California, Berkeley faculty
University of Washington faculty
People from Dauphin County, Pennsylvania
People from Berkeley, California
1911 births
2003 deaths
Leaders of the University of California, Berkeley
Presidents of the University of California System
20th-century American academics